A penumbral lunar eclipse took place on Monday, June 24, 2002, the second of three lunar eclipses in 2002. This penumbral eclipse was visibly imperceptible due to the small entry into the southern penumbral shadow.

This lunar eclipse was during the 2002 FIFA World Cup, occurring only 6 days before the 2002 FIFA World Cup Final, which was won by Brazil.

Visibility

Related lunar eclipses

Eclipse season 

This is the third eclipse this season.

First eclipse this season: 26 May 2002 Penumbral Lunar Eclipse

Second eclipse this season: 10 June 2002 Annular Solar Eclipse

Eclipses of 2002 
 A penumbral lunar eclipse on May 26.
 An annular solar eclipse on June 10.
 A penumbral lunar eclipse on June 24.
 A penumbral lunar eclipse on November 20.
 A total solar eclipse on December 4.

Half-Saros cycle
A lunar eclipse will be preceded and followed by solar eclipses by 9 years and 5.5 days (a half saros). This lunar eclipse is related to one partial solar eclipse of Solar Saros 156.

See also 
List of lunar eclipses
List of 21st-century lunar eclipses

References

External links 
 Saros cycle 149
 

2002-06
2002 in science